100 Fäuste und ein Vaterunser is an Italian-German film directed by Mario Siciliano. It was released in 1972.

Cast
 Ron Ely as Allaluja
 Alberto dell'Acqua as Sartana
 Uschi Glas as Mrs. Gibbons
 Angelika Ott as Therese
 Dan van Husen as Olsen
 Ezio Marano as Le Loup (as Alan Abbott)
 Dante Maggio as The General
 Stelio Candelli as Falco
 Enzo Andronico as Father O'Connor
 Lars Bloch as the Danish
 Carla Mancini as Julia
 Furio Meniconi as a citizen of Mossville
  as a wolf hunter

External links
 

1972 films
1970s Western (genre) comedy films
Spaghetti Western films
Italian Western (genre) comedy films
German Western (genre) comedy films
West German films
1970s buddy comedy films
1972 comedy films
1970s Italian-language films
1970s Italian films
1970s German films